Escape or Refuge (German: Zuflucht) is a 1928 German silent drama film directed by Carl Froelich and starring Henny Porten, Max Maximilian and Margarete Kupfer.

Plot summary

Cast
 Henny Porten as Hanne Lorek  
 Max Maximilian as Der alte Schurich  
 Margarete Kupfer as seine Frau  
 Alice Hechy as Guste, beider Tochter  
 Francis Lederer as Martin  
 Carl de Vogt as Kölling, Fleischergehilfe  
 Mathilde Sussin as Frau Falkhagen  
 Bodo Bronsky as Otto Falkhagen 
 Helmuth Neumann as Fritz, beider Sohn  
 Marion Mirimanian as Else, beider Tochter  
 Lotte Stein as Marie Jankowsky  
 Rudolf Biebrach as Hausarzt

References

Bibliography
 Grange, William. Cultural Chronicle of the Weimar Republic. Scarecrow Press, 2008.

External links
 
 

1928 films
Films of the Weimar Republic
Films directed by Carl Froelich
German silent feature films
Social realism in film
UFA GmbH films
German black-and-white films
German drama films
1928 drama films
Silent drama films
1920s German films
1920s German-language films